Benyamin may refer to

 Benyamin Bahadori, Iranian singer
 Benyamin (writer), pen name of Benny Daniel, Indian writer 
 Benyamin Sueb, Indonesian Comedian, actor, singer.

See also
Benjamin (disambiguation)
Benyamina